Heroin is an opioid drug, but the term may also refer to:

 Heroin (band), a hardcore punk band
 Heroin (Heroin album)
 Heroin (Z-Ro album), 2010
 "Heroin" (The Velvet Underground song), 1967
 "Heroin" (Buck-Tick song), a 1997 single by Buck-Tick
 "Heroin / Never Never", a 1998 single by Human Drama
"Heroin", a song by Superpitcher
"Heroin", a song by Lana Del Rey from Lust for Life

See also
 Heroine (disambiguation)
 Heroina (fish), a genus of fish belonging to the family Cichlidae